Lieutenant-Colonel Amelius Richard Mark Lockwood, 1st Baron Lambourne,  (17 August 1847 – 26 December 1928) was a British soldier and politician.

Background and education
Born Amelius Wood, he was the eldest son of Lieutenant-General William Mark Wood of Bishop's Hall, and Amelia Jane, daughter of Sir Robert Williams, 9th Baronet. He was a descendant of Richard Lockwood, Member of Parliament for Hindon, the City of London and Worcester in the early 18th century, whose father Richard Lockwood had acquired the Lambourne estate in Essex through his marriage to Susanna Cutts. He was educated at Eton. In 1876 he resumed by Royal licence the original family surname of Lockwood (his father having assumed the surname of Wood in 1828 according to the will of his maternal uncle Sir Mark Wood, 2nd Baronet).

Career
Lockwood joined the Coldstream Guards in 1866 but retired from the Army in 1883 with the rank of lieutenant-colonel. He sat as Conservative Member of Parliament for Epping from 1892 until 1917 and was also Provincial Grand Master of the Essex Freemasons from 1902, Vice President of the RSPCA, President of the Royal Horticultural Society and Chairman of the Governors of Chigwell School from 1893 to 1922. He was appointed a Privy Counsellor and a CVO in 1905, and raised to the peerage as Baron Lambourne, of Lambourne in the County of Essex, in 1917. On 18 May 1917, he was appointed a deputy lieutenant of Essex, and then served from 1919 until his death as Lord Lieutenant of Essex. In 1927 he was appointed a GCVO.

Family

Lord Lambourne married Isabella, daughter of Sir John Milbanke, 8th Baronet, in 1876. His nephew and heir, Richard Lockwood, was killed at the First Battle of the Aisne on 14 September 1914. Lady Lambourne died in September 1923. Lord Lambourne survived her by five years and died in December 1928, aged 81, when the barony became extinct. He is buried in the churchyard of St Mary and All Saints in Lambourne, Essex.

References

Sources cited
Who's who website
 Concise Dictionary of National Biography
 Old Lambourne
 Chigwell School

External links
 
 Coat of Arms

1847 births
1928 deaths
People educated at Eton College
Barons in the Peerage of the United Kingdom
Coldstream Guards officers
Lockwood, Mark
Knights Grand Cross of the Royal Victorian Order
Members of the Privy Council of the United Kingdom
Lockwood, Mark
Lockwood, Mark
Lockwood, Mark
Lockwood, Mark
Lockwood, Mark
Lockwood, Mark
UK MPs who were granted peerages
Directors of the London and North Western Railway
Lord-Lieutenants of Essex
Deputy Lieutenants of Essex
English justices of the peace
Barons created by George V